Nishri is a surname. Notable people with the surname include:

Zvi Nishri (Orloff) (1878–1973), Russian/Palestinian/Israeli pioneer in modern physical education 
Miri Nishri (born 1950), Colombian/Israeli interdisciplinary artist

See also
Nishi (surname)